South Rhodes ( - Nótia Ródos) is a former municipality on the island of Rhodes, in the Dodecanese, Greece. Since the 2011 local government reform it is part of the municipality Rhodes, of which it is a municipal unit.

Geography
The municipal unit comprises the southernmost portion of the island, and is a result of a union of ten former communities:

At the 2011 census, the population was 3,561. It has a land area of 379.050 km², covering about 27 percent of the island's area. The seat of the municipality was in Gennádi, a town of 671 inhabitants.

Gallery

References

External links

 South Rhodes official website 
Logo of South Rodes (dewiki)

Populated places in Rhodes